Skuggekammen Ridge is a jagged rock ridge extending southeastward from Mount Mentzel, in the Gruber Mountains of the Wohlthat Mountains, Queen Maud Land. Discovered and plotted from air photos by German Antarctic Expedition, 1938–39. Replotted from air photos and surveys by Norwegian Antarctic Expedition, 1956–60, and named Skuggekammen (the shade ridge).

Ridges of Queen Maud Land
Princess Astrid Coast